The British America Assurance Company was a fire insurance company established in York, Upper Canada in 1833. An impressive headquarter, it was designed by William Irving in 1877. The company expanded into the U.S. It also operated in Sydney and Adelaide. The company took hits during major conflagrations, such as the San Francisco fire of 1906.

The Canadian subsidiary of the Royal Insurance Company (now RSA Insurance Group) acquired the British America Assurance Company and the Western Assurance Company in 1961.

William Botsford Jarvis was one of the company's founders.

References

Defunct insurance companies of Canada
Financial services companies established in 1833
1833 establishments in Upper Canada
1961 mergers and acquisitions